is a multi-purpose stadium in Mito, Japan.  It is currently used mostly for football matches. It serves as the main home ground of Mito HollyHock, and is its home ground since 2009. The stadium holds 12,000 people and was rebuilt in 2009.

It was formerly known as Mito Stadium. Since August 2009 it has been called K's denki Stadium Mito for the naming rights.

It was heavily damaged by the major earthquake hitting Eastern Japan in 2011, making more than half the stadium unusable for months afterward.

References

External links 
J. League stadium guide 

Football venues in Japan
Athletics (track and field) venues in Japan
Multi-purpose stadiums in Japan
Rugby union stadiums in Japan
Mito HollyHock
Sports venues in Ibaraki Prefecture
Mito, Ibaraki
Sports venues completed in 1987
1987 establishments in Japan